Beat operates a taxi and ride-hailing mobile app for smartphones and other mobile devices. Beat's headquarters are located in Athens, Greece. About 90 percent of the company’s ride-booking activity is in Latin America, where more than 250,000 drivers work with the app.

Beat is currently available in Greece, Chile, Peru,  Colombia, Mexico and Argentina.

Background
Formerly known as Taxibeat, the company was founded in 2011 by Nikos Drandakis in collaboration with associates Nikos Damilakis, Kostis Sakkas and Michael Sfictos. The ride-hailing service was acquired by MyTaxi in February 2017, and was soon renamed to Beat. MyTaxi is a subsidiary of the automotive manufacturer Daimler AG.

Today the company is part of the FREE NOW group, the ride-hailing joint venture of BMW and Daimler.

References

Taxis
2011 establishments in Greece
Ridesharing companies
Companies based in Athens